Fangye Signal Station is a staffed railway station on the Taiwan Railways Administration (TRA) South-link line located in Shizi Township, Pingtung County, Taiwan. Although staffed, it is not a commuter station and has no scheduled train service.

Usage
The station is Taiwan's least used station, averaging only one passenger per day in 2012 (According to the TRA official report in 2015, the least used station is Neishi). The station is a traffic control station for trains making temporary stops to wait for another train to pass and is only used by railway workers.

Nearby stations
Taiwan Railway Administration
South-link Line
Fangshan - Fangye  - Central Signal - Puan Signal  - Guzhuang

See also
 List of railway stations in Taiwan

References

Railway signal stations in Taiwan
Railway stations served by Taiwan Railways Administration